Dukedom may refer to:

 The title and office of a duke
 Duchy, the territory ruled by a duke
 Dukedom, Kentucky and Tennessee, United States
 Dukedom (game), a land management game

See also
 Lists of dukedoms